The AFC U-17 Championship 2004 Qualification was held from October 11th through the 15th in 2003. The drawing for its matchups was conducted on July 18th, 2003 at the AFC office in Kuala Lumpur.

Group 1

Group 2
Both matches played in Oman

Group 3
All matches in Saudi Arabia

Group 4
All matches in Qatar

Group 5
All matches in Iran

Group 6
All matches in New Delhi, India

Group 7
All matches in Uzbekistan

Group 8
Both matches in Bangladesh

Group 9

Group 10
All matches in Laos

Group 11
All matches in Vietnam

Group 12

Group 13
All matches in South Korea

Group 14
All matches in North Korea

Group 15
All matches in China

Qualified Teams
 Host : 
 Group 1 : 
 Group 2 : 
 Group 3 : 
 Group 4 : 
 Group 5 : 
 Group 6 : 
 Group 7 : 
 Group 8 : 
 Group 9 : 
 Group 10 : 
 Group 11 : 
 Group 12 : 
 Group 13 : 
 Group 14 : 
 Group 15 :

References

Qual
AFC U-16 Championship qualification
Qual